Stage Entrance (Swedish: Sceningång) is a 1956 Swedish drama film directed by Bengt Ekerot and starring Edvin Adolphson, Margit Carlqvist and Gio Petré. It was shot at the Centrumateljéerna Studios in Stockholm and on location around the city. The film's sets were designed by the art director Nils Nilsson.

Synopsis
It portrays a day in the life of the Royal Dramatic Theatre and the various actors, students and others who make up its company as they prepare for a production of King Lear.

Cast
 Edvin Adolphson as Knut Mattsson
 Margit Carlqvist as 	Sigrid Jansson, actress
 Gio Petré as 	Nora Bring
 Lars Ekborg as 	Leander
 Bengt Ekerot as 	Johan Eriksson
 Per Sjöstrand as 	Sven, acting student
 Arne Nyberg as Unit manager
 Stig Olin as 	Bernard Stensson
 Erik Strandmark as 	Torén
 Sif Ruud as 	Landlady
 Erland Josephson as 	Bergkvist, director / Narrator
 Barbro Larsson as 	Student
 Renée Björling as Edit Strand
 Björn Berglund as Drama teacher
 Claes-Håkan Westergren as 	Hasse. acting student
 Tommy Nilson as 'Tjockis', acting student 
 Sissi Kaiser as 	Kristina, actress
 Gertrud Bodlund as 	Speech teacher
 Arne Lindblad as 	Make-up teacher
 Mona Åstrand as 	Eva, acting student
 Gunnel Sporr as 	Acting student
 Gull Natorp as 	Woman 
 Mona Geijer-Falkner as 	Cleaning lady
 Svea Holm as Cleaning lady 
 Helga Brofeldt as 	Prompter 
 Margit Andelius as 	Cleaning lady 
 Astrid Bodin as 	Cleaning lady

References

Bibliography 
 Cowie, Peter. Film in Sweden: Stars and Players. Tantivy Press, 1977.

External links 
 

1956 films
Swedish drama films
1956 drama films
1950s Swedish-language films
Films directed by Bengt Ekerot
Films set in Stockholm
1950s Swedish films
Swedish black-and-white films